Sir Maurice Flanagan  (17 November 1928 – 7 May 2015) was a British businessman, the founding CEO of Emirates and executive vice-chairman of The Emirates Group.

Early life
Flanagan was born in 1928 in Leigh, Lancashire, England. He attended initially the now defunct Leigh Boys Grammar School, starting the year World War II broke out, but transferred later to Lymm Grammar School, and then Liverpool University, where he gained a BA in History and French.  He performed his National Service in the RAF as a navigator commissioned officer. Receiving a national service commission as an acting pilot officer in February 1951, he was confirmed in the rank of pilot officer in November. On Christmas Day, 1952, he was appointed to a commission in the RAFVR. He was promoted to flying officer in March 1954, and relinquished his commission two years later.

During an evening outing, he suffered a knee injury that ruled out a potential career as a football player, which Blackburn Rovers had shown interest in fostering.

Career
Abandoning an athletic profession in 1953, he joined BOAC as a management trainee, subsequently working for the airline in Kenya, Sri Lanka, Peru, Iran, India and the UK.

In 1969, Flanagan was one of the winners of a TV playwriting competition run by the Observer newspaper and ITV's Saturday Night Theatre with "The Garbler Strategy", a satire on management theory that starred Leonard Rossiter. Kenneth Tynan, one of the competition judges, invited Flanagan to write for the National Theatre, where Tynan was literary advisor. Flanagan chose the more sure route of a promising airline career.

Flanagan spent 25 years with BOAC and British Airways, held senior management positions with  British Airways from 1974 until he was seconded from BA's senior management to Dnata, the organisation appointed by the government of Dubai to run its travel and airport interests.

In 1978, Flanagan was appointed director and general manager of Dubai National Air Travel Agency. In 1985, the Dubai government employed Flanagan to launch Emirates. The fledgling airline received $10 million start-up capital that it repaid the following year, marking its immediate success.

In 1990, Flanagan was appointed group managing director of the Emirates Group and became vice chairman and group president in July 2003. He was appointed executive vice chairman in 2006, he retired in 2013.

According to Jim Krane, a senior fellow at Rice University’s Baker Institute for Public Policy, “Flanagan was one of the last of a generation of British executive expatriates who helped build the institutions that made Dubai’s success”.

Retirement
After more than 60 enterprising years in aviation, including 35 years in the Emirates Group, Sir Maurice Flanagan, executive vice chairman, Emirates Airline & Group, decided to retire in April 2013.

Awards and honours
Flanagan was awarded a CBE in 2000 for services to communities in the United Arab Emirates and to aviation, and KBE in the 2010 Birthday Honours.

The music centre of Dubai College, a British school in the United Arab Emirates of which Flanagan was a board member, is also named after him, as the 'Sir Maurice Flanagan Music Centre'.

Other awards include Flight International magazine's Personality of the Year, membership of the British Travel Industry Hall of Fame, Aviation Legend award by the Centre for Asia Pacific Aviation, Fellow of the Royal Aeronautical Society and Honorary Fellow (the society's highest award), Liveryman of the Guild of Air Pilots and Air Navigators, and membership of the executive committee of the World Travel and Tourism Council.

Personal life and death
In 1955, he married Audrey Bolton, a journalist, with whom he has three children and five grandchildren.

Flanagan died at his home in London on 7 May 2015 at the age of 86.

References

Sources
Mathew Murphy. No flights of fancy for an airline man, profile in The Age (Australia), 10 November 2007
Louise Armitstead. Emirates boss heads for bigger goals, profile in The Sunday Times (UK), 23 July 2006
Travel and Tourism News profile & list of awards
Wharton Business School profile

1928 births
2015 deaths
Knights Commander of the Order of the British Empire
British chief executives
Alumni of the University of Liverpool
Businesspeople in aviation
Businesspeople awarded knighthoods
The Emirates Group
British emigrants to the United Arab Emirates
People from Dubai
20th-century Royal Air Force personnel
Royal Air Force officers